Arunas Rudvalis (born June 8, 1945) is an Emeritus Professor of Mathematics at the University of Massachusetts Amherst. He is best known for the Rudvalis group.

Rudvalis went to the Harvey Mudd College and received his Ph.D. degree in Dartmouth College under direction of Ernst Snapper.

External links
 Arunas Rudvalis's Web Page
 

1945 births
20th-century American mathematicians
21st-century American mathematicians
Harvey Mudd College alumni
Dartmouth College alumni
University of Massachusetts Amherst faculty
Living people